Carlos Eduardo "Cadu" Castro da Silva (born 23 April 1982) is a Brazilian football player who played as striker.

Since he played for South Korean side Jeonbuk Hyundai Motors in 2003, Cadu has played for many foreign clubs including Germinal Beerschot in Belgium, União Leiria in Portugal, Hatta Club in the U.A.E. and Bnei Sakhnin FC in Israel.

External links

Brazilian FA Database 
Profile at Portuguese Liga 

1982 births
Living people
People from Cuiabá
Brazilian footballers
Brazilian expatriate footballers
CR Vasco da Gama players
Jeonbuk Hyundai Motors players
Villa Rio Esporte Clube players
U.D. Leiria players
Bnei Sakhnin F.C. players
S.C. Olhanense players
K League 1 players
Belgian Pro League players
Primeira Liga players
Israeli Premier League players
Associação Desportiva Cabofriense players
Hapoel Nir Ramat HaSharon F.C. players
Clube Sociedade Esportiva players
Guarani FC players
Association football forwards
Expatriate footballers in South Korea
Expatriate footballers in the United Arab Emirates
Expatriate footballers in Portugal
Expatriate footballers in Belgium
Expatriate footballers in Israel
Brazilian expatriate sportspeople in South Korea
Sportspeople from Mato Grosso